Tokaldan (also Romanized as Tokaldān) is a village in Aghmiyun Rural District, in the Central District of Sarab County, East Azerbaijan Province, Iran. At the 2006 census, its population was 577, in 135 families.

References 

Populated places in Sarab County